The Panyjima, also known as the Banjima, are an Aboriginal Australian people of the Pilbara region of Western Australia.

Language
The Panyjima speak one of the Ngayarda sub-group of the Pama-Nyungan languages. The number of speakers was estimated in 2002 to be around fifty.

Country
They dwelt on the upper plateau of the Hamersley Range and as far south as the Fortescue River. Their eastern frontier lay at Weeli Wolli Creek, near Marillana. Their southern limits lay around Rocklea and on the upper branches of Turee Creek, as ran east as far as the Kunderong Range.

History of contact
Before the period of contact with European, the highlander Kurrama pressured them out to shift east as far as Yandicoogina and the Ophthalmia Range, a movement which in turn drove the Mandara and Niabali eastwards.

Native title

Alternative names
 Bandjima (western tribal pronunciation)
 Mandanjongo ("top people", Nyamal exonym for plateau people such as the Panyjima and the Yindjibarndi)
 Panjima, Pand'ima

Notes

Citations

Sources

Pilbara
Aboriginal peoples of Western Australia